This is a comparison of notable time-tracking software packages and web hosted services.

See also 
 Deployment management
 Flextime plan
 Project management software
 Timesheet
 Working time

References 

Administrative software
Lists of software
Software comparisons